

2011

See also
 2011 in Australia
 2011 in Australian television
 List of 2011 box office number-one films in Australia

2011
Lists of 2011 films by country or language
Films